South Howden railway station was a station on the Hull and Barnsley Railway, and served the town of Howden in the East Riding of Yorkshire, England.

History
The station opened on 22 July 1885 as Howden and was renamed in 1922. It was the second of two railway stations to serve the town and was situated on the northern edge of the town.

It was closed to passengers on 1 August 1955 and closed completely on 6 April 1959.

References

External links
 South Howden station on navigable 1947 O. S. map

Disused railway stations in the East Riding of Yorkshire
Railway stations in Great Britain opened in 1885
Railway stations in Great Britain closed in 1959
Former Hull and Barnsley Railway stations
Howden